Ole Mathisen (born 13 February 1965) is a Norwegian jazz musician (saxophone and clarinet) and composer. He is a critically acclaimed saxophonist and active performer on the New York City and the international jazz scene, and known for more than 80 recordings. He has performed with artists such as Paula Cole, Louie Vega, Omar Hakim, Darryl Jones, Hiram Bullock, Tom Coster, Mark Egan, Steve Smith, Mino Cinelu, Peter Erskine, Eddie Gómez, Badal Roy, Rufus Reid, Ron Carter, Grady Tate, Claudio Roditi, Will Lee, LaVerne Baker, Abraham Laboriel, Randy Brecker, Gil Goldstein, Lew Soloff, Tiger Okoshi, Michael Gibbs, Harvie Swartz, Jon Christensen, Gary Husband, Bill Bruford, Kenny Barron, Bob Moses, Jeff Berlin, Hilton Ruiz, Petter Wettre, Adam Nussbaum, Frankie Valli, and Dream Theater, and has composed music for film and television. He is the brother of jazz musicians Per Mathisen (bass), Hans Mathisen (guitar) and Nils Mathisen (keyboards, guitar and bass).

Career
Mathisen received his bachelor's degree in Professional Music from Berklee College of Music in Boston in 1988. While at Berklee he studied for three years with renowned saxophonist Joe Viola. He moved to New York City in 1993 and received a master's degree in Jazz Performance from Manhattan School of Music at the Columbia University 1995, studying saxophone with Bob Mintzer, arranging with Maria Schneider, and film scoring with Ed Green.

Mathisen has been regular with Chris Washburne and his Latin jazz band «SYOTOS Band» (four albums). He was the leader of the orchestra «Anomaly», and with his brothers Per (bass) and Hans Mathisen (guitar) he contributed in Chris Washburne Sextet «NYNDK» (2003–), releasing Jazzheads (2006).  Mathisen has also performed with Petter Wettre and Adam Nussbaum/Francois Moutin in the production «Conspiracy».

Otherwise, he has this country contributed to releases by Hans Mathisen and Olga Konkova, and played
clarinet on the concert DVD by Dream Theater in 2006.

Honors
1984: Phil Woods Incentive Award, Berklee College of Music
1987: Faculty Association Award (Berklee College of Music)
1993: Norwegian Government
1999: Tono Work Stipend, Norwegian Composers Rights Organization
2004: Ascaplus Award, Ascap
2005: Ascaplus Award, Ascap
2006: DANY ARTS grant, awarded NYNDK
2007: Ascaplus Award

Discography

Solo albums 
With Russ Lossing, François Moutin and Tony Moreno
2007: Chinese Horoscope (Jazzheads)

With Tony Moreno, François Moutin and Kenny Wessel
2010: Periodic Table (Jazzheads)

With Per Mathisen and Paolo Vinaccia
2011: Elastics (Losen Records)

Collaborations 
With Fernando Tarres
1992: On the Edges of White (Muse Records)

With Bob Moses
1993: Time Stood Still (Gramavision Records)

With Randy Roos
1993: Liquid Smoke (Narada Records)

With Mighty Sam McClain
1995: Keep on Movin''' (Audioquest Records)
1999: Soul Survivor: The Best of Mighty Sam McClain (Audioquest Records)

With Ahmad Mansour
1995: Creatures (Gorgone Jazz), including with Terje Gewelt and Ian Froman

With Eduardo Tancredi
1995: Indo E Vindo (Vee Records)

With Steve Hunt
1997: From Your Heart and Soul (Spice Rack Records)

With Jamshied Sharifi
1997: A Prayer for the Soul of Layla (Alula Records)
2003: One (Ceres Records)

With Bruno Råberg
1998: Orbis (Orbis Music), including with Tim Ray (Fender Rhodes, Piano) and Bob Moses
2000: Presence (Orbis Music), including with Marcello Pellitteri (drums)

With Chris Washburne and the SYOTOS Band
1999: Nuyorican Nights (Jazzheads)
2001: The Other Side: El Otro Lado (Jazzheads)
2003: Paradise in Trouble (Jazzheads)
2010: Fields of Moons (Jazzheads)

With Olga Konkova
2001: Northern Crossings (Candid Records)

With Jiro Yoshida
2002: My Beating Heart (3D Records)

Within NYNDK (New York Norway Denmark)
2004: NYNDK (Jazzheads)
2007: Nordic Disruption (Jazzheads)
2009: The Hunting of the Snark (Jazzheads)

Within String Zone including Stig Roar Wigestrand (violin), Per Einar Watle, Øivind Wang Tollefsen (guitars), and Per Mathisen (double-bass)
2004: Mystery Bag (Nagel Heyer Records)

With Dream Theater
2006: Score: XOX - 20th Anniversary World Tour Live with the Octavarium Orchestra (Rhino/Warner Bros.)

With Stevie Holland
2006: More Than Words Can Say (150 Music)
2008: Before Love Has Gone (150 Music)

With Chris Washburne
2006: Land of Nod (Jazzheads)

With Hans Mathisen
2006: Quiet songs (Curling Legs), including with Johannes Eick and Per Mathisen (bass), Gary Husband and Per Oddvar Johansen (drums), and Olga Konkova (piano)

With Mamak Khadem
2007: Jostojoo Forever Seeking (Banyan Tree/Mamak Khadem)

With Keiko Lee
2007: In Essence (Ais/Sony Music)

With Amir ElSaffar
2011: Inana (Pi Recordings)
2013: Alchemy (Pi Recordings)

Within FFEAR including with Chris Washburne (Composer, trombone), Per Mathisen (bass)
2012: Mirage (Jazzheads)

 Film music 
With Michael Gibbs Original Soundtrack
1996: Hard Boiled'' (Fine Line), a John Woo Film

References

External links
Ole Mathisen Associate in Music Performance profile at Department of Music, Columbia University

Norwegian jazz saxophonists
Norwegian jazz clarinetists
Norwegian jazz composers
Male jazz composers
Curling Legs artists
Losen Records artists
Alessa Records artists
Musicians from Sandefjord
1965 births
Living people
21st-century saxophonists
21st-century clarinetists
21st-century Norwegian male musicians